The Wisconsin State Patrol is the state patrol for the state of Wisconsin and is a division of the Wisconsin Department of Transportation. The Wisconsin State Patrol enforces traffic and criminal laws, oversees the motor carrier safety and weight facilities (SWEFs), inspects and regulates motor carriers, school buses and ambulances, and assists local law enforcement agencies with traffic safety, civil disturbances and disasters (natural and man-made).

History
Prior to 1939, some statewide enforcement efforts through were made through other government departments. For example, in 1917, the Dairy and Food Department and the Oil Inspection Department were legally authorized to conduct investigations of the licensing and vehicle sale laws. Also, in 1931, the State Highway Administration had personnel dedicated to checking truck traffic and weights.

On September 1, 1939, the Wisconsin legislature passed a statute creating the Motor Vehicle Department, which consisted of three divisions.  The new Enforcement Division began with 46 "inspectors" -comprised from five smaller agencies within other departments, to enforce the state motor vehicle code and regulate motor carriers.  There were 33 Public Service Commission Transportation Inspectors, 8 Inspection Bureau inspectors and 5 Secretary of State Investigators.  Inspectors were paid $180 per month.  The new traffic officers were supplied a siren, flashing red lights, police license plates and an official shield for the sides of their personal cars.  The state also paid $30.00 a month for gasoline, oil and grease.

State Patrol radio first went on the air February 1, 1943, operating station WIZR on a frequency of 31.5 megahertz. It was able to communicate with the patrol's mobile units, as well as with most of the municipal and county law enforcement short-wave stations.

The Wisconsin State Patrol (WSP) was established the purpose of providing law enforcement services in a rapidly changing transportation environment.  Along with that effort, it was recognized from its inception that the WSP would stand ready to provide public safety assistance to local, county and tribal units of government as well as our partner agencies at the state and federal levels.  Through the years many changes have been made, but the patrol's goal has always been and will continue to be assisting the motoring public and making Wisconsin's highways safe.

In 1970, the statutory limit for the number of troopers in the state was increased from 375 to 400 (WI ss. 110.07).

The State Patrol currently operates 16 safety and weight enforcement facilities throughout Wisconsin.

The Wisconsin State Patrol Academy at Fort McCoy (Tomah, WI) provides diverse law enforcement training programs for federal, state and local law enforcement officers.

Mission
As stated on its website, the State Patrol provides traffic safety and enforcement services for Wisconsin. Like all highway patrol and state patrol agencies, its primary mission is to enforce the provisions of the Wisconsin Motor Vehicle laws and other laws to prevent crime. State troopers and inspectors have statewide jurisdiction for traffic and criminal enforcement.
 
These are the services provided statewide by the agency:

 Traffic law enforcement through freeway patrols and Major Highways
 Accident scene reconstruction and crime scene mapping for investigations
 Motor carrier safety inspections
 Commercial vehicle size and weight enforcement
 Inspections of school buses, ambulances, motor coaches, and salvage vehicles
 Evaluation and maintenance of breath-alcohol testing equipment; also provides training to some county and local law enforcement agencies in using such equipment
 Assistance to county and local law enforcement agencies when requested upon
 Law enforcement training at the Wisconsin State Patrol Academy
 Traffic safety programs

Troopers typically patrol an assigned geographic area along key travel corridors like interstates and other multi-lane freeways. Their primary duties are to ensure safe traffic movement, respond to crashes or other incidents, assist stranded motorists and local law enforcement agencies.

Inspectors, along with traffic enforcement duties, receive additional training regarding federal motor carrier rules that impact commercial motor vehicles and CMV drivers. Inspectors often work out of one of the State Patrol’s 13 Safety and Weight Enforcement Facilities (SWEFs) across the state. SWEFs at key state border locations incorporate modern technologies such as weigh-in-motion devices and indoor inspection bays that enhance public safety and the efficient movement of commerce.

The State Patrol maintains and manages the facilities of the Mobile Data Communications Network (MDCN), a system that supports remote access to information available from the United States Department of Justice. The service is provided free of charge to allied criminal justice agencies in Wisconsin.

Training
A training academy was established in 1955 to offer formal education instructions in partnership with the Northwestern University Traffic Institute. Since 1957, the agency has been training its recruits with its own staff.

Training for recruits currently lasts 26 weeks in a paramilitary setting. Fort McCoy itself is a military installation run by the United States Army.

Prior to joining the academy, recruits must pass several phases during initial testing. Those phases include a physical agility test, a background investigation, an interview, and a psychological/medical exams.

Today not only State Patrol officers, but county and municipal law enforcement officers are being trained in the latest techniques of traffic law enforcement at the patrol's training academy facilities at Fort McCoy.

The State Patrol today
The State Patrol became part of the Wisconsin Department of Transportation in the 1960s, and was designated a DOT division in 1977. In 2003, the Bureau of Transportation Safety was incorporated into the State Patrol.

In 2005 the State Patrol reorganized and went from seven districts to five regions.

Southwest Region DeForest and Tomah Posts
Southeast Region Waukesha Post
Northeast Region Fond du Lac Post
North Central Region Wausau Post
Northwest Region Eau Claire and Spooner Posts

The central office is located within the Hill Farms State Office Building in Madison.

The Bureau of Field Operations (BFO) provides traffic law enforcement services and promotes highway safety in Wisconsin. This is primarily accomplished by troopers, inspectors, and law enforcement dispatchers located in Wisconsin State Patrol Posts and Safety and Weight Enforcement Facilities statewide. The Motor Carrier Enforcement section oversees motor carrier safety and weight facilities (SWEFs), and inspects and regulates motor carriers, school buses and ambulances.  The bureau also enforces criminal and traffic laws, conducts criminal highway interdiction programs, and helps local law enforcement agencies with traffic safety, civil disturbances and disasters (natural and man-made).

Specialized Services within the Wisconsin State Patrol Bureau of Field Operations include: a K9 unit, with K9s certified in narcotics detection and explosive substance detection; an Honor Guard unit; an Air Support Unit with pilots and aircraft (including unmanned drones) strategically spread throughout the state; a Mobile Field Force unit; a motorcycle unit; a SWAT team that is able to rapidly deploy when needed; and a Technical Reconstruction Unit for investigation of particularly serious crashes.

The State Patrol uses marked and unmarked vehicles, as well as motorcycles, to perform its mission.

Since 2020, troopers have been armed with the Glock 17 9mm pistol  as their standard issue sidearm which replaced the Glock 22 .40 S&W issued in the mid 2000s, and the Ruger P-series 9mm pistols prior to. In the late 1980's the WSP began fielding the Ruger P-85 which they carried until the early 1990s when they chose the newer Ruger P-89 which was replaced by the Glocks. Prior to the semi-automatic pistols the patrol carried the Smith & Wesson Model 66 service revolvers. All troopers also carry M4-style rifles.

Strength
As of 2020, Wisconsin had 489 troopers and inspectors, including first line supervisors and executive management, according to data provided by the Wisconsin State Patrol.

Fallen officers
Since the establishment of the Wisconsin State Patrol, there have been eight line of duty deaths.

See also

 List of law enforcement agencies in Wisconsin
 State police
 State patrol
 Highway patrol

References

Further reading
 State Trooper: America's State Troopers and Highway Patrolmen (Turner Publishing Company - 2001)

External links

State law enforcement agencies of Wisconsin
Government agencies established in 1939
1939 establishments in Wisconsin